Mihal Thano (born 29 April 1993) is a Greek–born Albanian footballer who most recently played for Luftëtari Gjirokastër in the Albanian Superliga.

Honours
Luftëtari
Albanian First Division (1): 2015–16

References

1993 births
Living people
Albanians in Greece
Greek people of Albanian descent
Albanian footballers
Association football goalkeepers
Luftëtari Gjirokastër players
Kategoria e Parë players
Kategoria Superiore players
Greek expatriates in Albania
Footballers from Ioannina
PAS Giannina F.C. players